Dierenselaan is a RandstadRail stop in Den Haag, the Netherlands.

History

The station is a stop for line 4 and is on the Apeldoornselaan. The stop opened at the same time as the RandstadRail line did.

RandstadRail services
The following services currently call at Dierenselaan:

Gallery

RandstadRail stations in The Hague